Boussoit is a village of Wallonia and a district of the municipality of La Louvière, located in the province of Hainaut,  Belgium.

External links
 

Former municipalities of Hainaut (province)
La Louvière